Outside Society is a compilation album released by American singer-songwriter, poet and visual artist Patti Smith. Outside Society is the first single-disc collection of her work and spans her entire career. The songs are in chronological order and the booklet contains comments by Smith on her work.

Track listing

Charts

References 

2011 greatest hits albums
Patti Smith albums
Legacy Recordings albums
Legacy Recordings compilation albums